Events in the year 1719 in Norway.

Incumbents
Monarch: Frederick IV

Events
 January – The Carolean Death March.
 Postvesenet became state owned.

Deaths

23 May – Gerhard Treschow, merchant and industrial pioneer (born c. 1659).
31 July – Thormodus Torfæus, historian (born 1636 in Iceland).
Nils Engelhart, priest, pietist pioneer (born c.1668).

See also

References